Bartolomeo Averoldi (died 1537) was a Roman Catholic prelate who served as Bishop of Rethymo (1517–1537).

Biography
On 18 September 1517, Bartolomeo Averoldi was appointed during the papacy of Pope Leo X as Bishop of Rethymo.
He served as Bishop of Rethymo until his death in 1537.

References

External links and additional sources
  (for Chronology of Bishops) 
  (for Chronology of Bishops) 

16th-century Roman Catholic bishops in the Republic of Venice
Bishops appointed by Pope Leo X
1537 deaths